The Vernons Girls were an English musical ensemble of female vocalists.  They were formed at the Vernons football pools company in the 1950s in Liverpool, settling down to a sixteen strong choir and recording an album of standards.

Career
As a 16-piece vocal group, the Vernons Girls appeared on the ITV show Oh Boy! with the house band between 1958 and 1959, and made a series of relatively successful singles for the label Parlophone between 1958 and 1961. Their 1958 LP released on Parlophone was arranged and conducted by Peter Knight, with sleeve notes by Eamonn Andrews.  This record is significantly different from their later pop hits, featuring such fifties standards as "We'll Gather Lilacs", "Lonely Ballerina", and the "Cuckoo in the Clock". 

Led by Maureen Kennedy, from 1961 the group reduced their membership to five and then three members, and by 1962 had signed to Decca Records where they recorded covers of American hits.  Their cover of Clyde McPhatter's "Lover Please" and "You Know What I Mean" were both hits; the latter was also originally the B-side of "Lover Please".  In the US, the group charted with the first Beatles tribute album there, We Love The Beatles. The Carefrees had previously charted with a Beatles tribute called "We Love You Beatles" in the UK in 1964.

As session singers for Decca, the Vernons Girls were the female backing voices on many hit singles during the 1960s – one of the first being Billy Fury's "Maybe Tomorrow".  The trio of Jean Owen (aka Samantha Jones), Frances Lea, and Maureen Kennedy also appeared on film in the 1964 TV special Around The Beatles with the Beatles plus Long John Baldry, P. J. Proby and Millie Small, in the Billy Fury film Play It Cool, and in Just For Fun; ex-member Vicky Haseman also appeared in this, with her group, the Breakaways.

When Jean Owen left the group, she was replaced by Jane Sutton on lead vocals. The group's new lineup continued to make new recordings and television appearances.

However, by 1964, their chart successes had halted and they disbanded.

Later careers
Some of the girls continued in show business ventures:  

Lyn Cornell married session drummer Andy White (notable for replacing Ringo Starr on an early take of "Love Me Do"), and became a successful solo performer; having a chart hit with the title song to the film "Never on Sunday" in 1960 – and later becoming one of the Pearls. 

Vicky Haseman formed the Breakaways, and married Joe Brown.  Their daughter Sam Brown is a well-known singer in her own right. 

Joyce Baker married Marty Wilde; they formed a trio with Justin Hayward called the Wilde Three, and were the parents of singers Ricky Wilde, Roxanne Wilde and  Kim Wilde. 

Jean Owen had solo success under the name Samantha Jones.

Other members of the group banded together in various combinations as duets and singing trios; these include the Redmond Twins,  the Pearls, the Two Tones and the DeLaine Sisters.  The DeLaine Sisters had a minor hit in the United Kingdom with the Goffin & King song "It Might As Well Rain Until September".

The group also appeared on the second episode of The Lily Savage Show, alongside Savage (Paul O'Grady in drag), singing one of their hits.

The longest surviving and best known of the groups, the Ladybirds, was formed by Maggie Stredder with Marian Davies and Gloria George. The Ladybirds are best known for their long association with The Benny Hill Show, and for performing the backing vocals on BBC television's Top of the Pops. They performed the backing vocals on the Jimi Hendrix Experience's first single, "Hey Joe".

More recently, Stredder and Sheila Bruce, together with ex-Ladybird Penny Lister, performed on tour with their friends as part of the 'Solid Gold Rock 'n' Roll Show'.  In the later 1990s, they appeared in Cliff Richard's show, 'Oh Boy', from the Wembley Stadium.

Personnel
Maggie Stredder (born Margaret Elisabeth Stredder, 9 January 1936, Birkenhead – died 9 March 2018) She married writer Roy Tuvey on 1 October 1966
Vicki Brown (born Victoria Mary Haseman, 23 August 1940, Liverpool – 16  June, 1991, Henley-on-Thames) – later in The Breakaways – married Joe Brown
Joyce Smith (born Joyce Baker, 1941) – married Marty Wilde, mother of Kim and Ricky Wilde
Lyn Cornell (b. 1940, Liverpool) – later in the Pearls – married Andy White
Maureen Kennedy (born 1940, Liverpool, died c. 1970) – married comedian Mike Hope – she died in a car accident  
Jean Owen (born 17 November 1943, Liverpool) – performed under her real name with the group before going solo and changing her name into Samantha Jones.  She married her long term adviser, showbiz accountant Jose Goumal
Frances Lea (born 1940, St Helens, died 18 May 2014, Reading)
Eileen Marina Byrne – (born in 1934, in Bootle, Liverpool, died in 1981 from breast cancer).  She married William Percival Homewood (A submariner in The Royal Navy).
Ann O'Brien (Simmons) – later in The Pearls
Sybil Richardson – still singing and performing in 2011
Elizabeth Isaac (born Elizabeth Liddy, 1936) - married John Robert Isaac (a dockyard engineer).
Jean Ryder - a member of the group from 1958 to 1962, Ryder later married the songwriter Mike Hawker. She was also a member of The De Laine Sisters and The Breakaways  She died in 2020 after a long illness.
Margaret Shortell - Born 1941, Glossop, a member of the group from 1960, she eventually married and left the group. She died in 2016
Dorothy Parkin aka Stevie Vernon born 1937, Liverpool; married Vernon Whitaker Ball (1934-2020) and left before 1960.

Discography

UK singles
"White Bucks and Saddle Shoes" / "Lost and Found" (Parlophone) (1958)
"Jealous Heart" / "Now is the Month of Maying" (Parlophone) (1959)
"Don't Look Now But" / "Who Are They To Say?" (Parlophone) (1959)
"Boy Meets Girl" / "We Like Boys" (Parlophone) (1960)
"Madison Time (with Jimmy Savile)" / "The Oo-We" (Parlophone) (1960)
"Ten Little Lonely Boys" / "Anniversary Song" (Parlophone) (1961)
"Let's Get Together" / "No Message" (Parlophone) (1961)  
"Lover Please" / "You Know What I Mean" (Decca) (1962) – UK No. 16
"The Loco-Motion" / "Don't Wanna Go" (Decca) (1962) – UK No. 47
"Funny All Over" / "See for Yourself" (Decca) (1963) – UK 31
"Do The Bird" / "I'm Gonna Let My Hair Down" (Decca) (1963) – UK No. 44
"He'll Never Come Back" / "Stay-At-Home" (Decca) (1963)
"Tomorrow is Another Day" / "Why, Why, Why?" (Decca) (1963)
"We Love the Beatles (Beatlemania)" / "Hey Lover Boy" (Decca) (1964)
"Only You Can Do It" / "Stupid Little Girl" (Decca) (1964)
"It's a Sin to Tell a Lie" / "Don't Say Goodbye" (Decca) (1964)
EP "The Vernons Girls" (Decca) (1962)
LP "The Vernons Girls" (Parlophone) (1958)

See also
List of artists under the Decca Records label

References

External links
Whatever became of the stars of Oh Boy
[ The Vernons Girls biography at the Allmusic website]

Musical groups established in the 1950s
English vocal groups
English girl groups
Decca Records artists